The Shiralee is a 1957 British film in the Australian Western genre. It was made by Ealing Studios, starring Peter Finch, directed by Leslie Norman and based on the 1955 novel by D'Arcy Niland. Although all exterior scenes were filmed in Sydney, Scone and Binnaway, New South Wales and Australian actors Charles Tingwell, Bill Kerr and Ed Devereaux played in supporting roles, the film is really a British film made in Australia, rather than an Australian film.

Plot
An itinerant rural worker named Macauley —sometimes described as a "swagman" or "swaggie"—suddenly finds himself taking responsibility for his child. In their time together in the barren landscapes of the outback, father and daughter bond. The child is the "shiralee", an Irish or Aboriginal word meaning "swag", or metaphorically, a "burden."

Having returned to Sydney from "walkabout", he finds his wife living with another man. He beats up the man and takes his daughter, Buster, with him. Macauley tries to get a job with a previous employer, Parker, but he angrily tells Macauley to go away, saying he had left his daughter Lily pregnant. Macauley tries to leave Buster with some friends of his, but she runs after him and he relents. Macauley narrowly prevents his wife making off with Buster, but after Buster is hit by a car and badly injured, he finds out that his wife is divorcing him and trying to gain legal custody of Buster. He returns to Sydney to fight it, leading to a violent confrontation with his wife's new lover.

Cast

 Peter Finch as Jim Macauley 
 Dana Wilson as Buster Macauley 
 Elizabeth Sellars as Marge Macauley 
 George Rose as Donny 
 Rosemary Harris as Lily Parker 
 Russell Napier as Mr. W.G. Parker 
 Niall MacGinnis as Beauty Kelly 
 Tessie O'Shea as Bella Sweeney 
 Sid James as Luke Sweeney 
 Charles 'Bud' Tingwell as Jim Muldoon
 Reg Lye as Desmond 
 Barbara Archer as Shopgirl 
 Alec Mango as Papadoulos 
 John Phillips as Doctor
 Bruce Beeby as solicitor
 Frank Leighton as barman
 Nigel Lovell as O'Hara
 John Cazabon as Charlie the Butcher 
 Mark Daly as Sam 
 Ed Devereaux as Christy 
 Guy Doleman as Son O'Neill 
 Lloyd Berrell
 Bettina Dickson
 Gordon Glenwright
 Fred Goddard
 Clifford Hunter
 Stuart McWhirter as person placing bet on swagmen
 Betty McDowall as Girl at Parkers
 Henry Murdoch
 Frank Raynor
 Lou Vernon
 David Williams
 Chin Yu
 Bill Kerr as a shopkeeper (uncredited)
 Ron Whelan

Production
Leslie Norman said he read the book, "loved it" and sent it to Michael Balcon at Ealing. According to Norman, "Mick roasted me, said it was full of foul language and how dare I? I said that it wouldn't be in the film, so he said all right and to get him a script."

Ealing had paid a reported £10,000 for the film rights to the book.

Norman says he wrote a script, showed it to Balcon who "claimed it was a different story, so we called in Neil Patterson to rewrite. He only rewrote one scene but it was enough to appease Mick. I suffered a lot from Mick."

Ealing signed an agreement with MGM for the latter studio to distribute their films worldwide; The Shiralee was to be the first film they made together.

Leslie Norman arrived in Sydney in April 1956 to begin preproduction. Finch arrived in July and an extensive talent search was conducted to find the actress to play Buster. Eight-year-old Dana Wilson of Croydon, Sydney, was cast.

The film was shot in the last months of 1956, first on location in north east New South Wales near Scone, then at MGM's studios in London. Child stars were not encouraged in British cinema so Dana Wilson's presence was downplayed by the studio during the English leg of production.

The cast included several Australian actors working in London.

Reception
According to Kinematograph Weekly the film was "in the money" at the British box office in 1957.

According to another account, the film was the tenth most popular film at the British box office in 1957 and earned $920,000 worldwide ($60,000 at the US and Canadian box office). After costs of production and distribution, the film made a profit of $149,000.

Peter Finch later said the film and his role in it were among his favourites in his career. Norman says Finch "was marvellous... it was great working with him. Of course he was not a Balcon sort of character at all – too wild a lifestyle."

Music
The song "Shiralee" used as soundtrack was sung by Tommy Steele and reached #11 on the United Kingdom Singles Chart in 1957.

References

Bibliography
 Andrew Pike and Ross Cooper, Australian Film 1900–1977: A Guide to Feature Film Production, Melbourne: Oxford University Press, 1998, 224. 
 Albert Moran and Errol Vieth, Historical Dictionary of Australian and New Zealand Cinema, Lanham, Maryland: Scarecrow Press, 2005.

External links
 
 The Shiralee at Australian Screen Online
The Shiralee at Oz Movies

1957 films
1957 drama films
British drama films
Films based on Australian novels
Films set in Australia
Ealing Studios films
Films directed by Leslie Norman
Films produced by Michael Balcon
Films scored by John Addison
Films shot at MGM-British Studios
1950s English-language films
1950s British films